Budiná is a village and municipality in the Lučenec District in the Banská Bystrica Region of Slovakia.

History
In historical records, the village was first mentioned in 1393 (1393 Brtolehutaya, 1467 Budalehotha). It belonged to Divín castle. From 1554 to 1595 it suffered Turkish occupation.

External links
 
https://web.archive.org/web/20071217080336/http://www.statistics.sk/mosmis/eng/run.html
http://www.e-obce.sk/obec/budina/budina.html

Villages and municipalities in Lučenec District